Geometra is a genus of moths in the family Geometridae.

Species in Europe
Geometra papilionaria (Linnaeus, 1758)

References
Natural History Museum Lepidoptera genus database

Geometrinae